Ignacij Klemenčič (6 February 1853, in Kamni Potok – 5 September 1901, in Trebnje) was a Carniolan (Slovenian) physicist.

1853 births
1901 deaths
Carniolan physicists
People from the Municipality of Trebnje